Henry Dakin may refer to:

 Henry Drysdale Dakin (1880–1952), English chemist
 Henry H. Dakin (1870–1956), provincial politician in Alberta, Canada